was a Japanese politician who served as Prime Minister of Japan from 1974 until 1976.

Early life and family 
Takeo Miki was born on 17 March 1907, in Gosho, Tokushima Prefecture (present-day Awa, Tokushima), the only child of farmer-merchant Hisayoshi Miki and his wife Takano. Aside from farming, his father traded fertilizers, sake, rice and general goods, though he was not a wealthy farmer (gōnō) or from a family of pedigree (kyūke). Hisayoshi was born in Kakihara, near Gosho, to farmer Rokusaburō Ino'o, and after briefly working in Osaka, he returned and began working for the Shibata family, the largest landowner in Gosho. He met Takano Miki, the daughter of farmer Tokitarō Miki, when the two were working for the Shibata family. Hisayoshi took Takano's surname after marriage, and the newlywed were given a house by the Shibata family.

When Miki was born, Hisayoshi was 33 and Takano was 38 years old, and Miki was raised with much love as he was the only child. His mother was particularly careful about his healthcare.

While studying at Meiji University's Faculty of Law, Miki was able to visit the United States, where he saw firsthand both Anglo-American liberal society as well as that society's aversion towards totalitarian states such as Nazi Germany, Fascist Italy, and the Soviet Union. He attended the University of Southern California in Los Angeles, and was awarded an honorary doctorate in law from the institution in 1966.

Pre-LDP political career 
During 1937 Miki was elected to the Diet; he remained there for the rest of his life, winning re-election no fewer than 19 times over 51 years. In the 1942 general election he openly voiced opposition to the military government under Hideki Tojo and still managed to win a seat; his efforts at this time were assisted by Kan Abe, the grandfather of Prime Minister Shinzō Abe.

In the earlier post-war period, Miki led the centrist National Cooperative Party in the 1947 and 1949 general elections, to limited success. In the early 1950s, Miki joined Ichirō Hatoyama's Democratic Party, which was one of the two main conservative factions of the time and took a stance that was critical of Shigeru Yoshida and his Liberal Party. These two factions eventually merged in 1955 to form the modern-day Liberal Democratic Party (LDP), which Miki joined as well.

Later political career (in the LDP) 
As the head of an LDP faction, Miki held cabinet posts in the administrations of Ichirō Hatoyama, Nobusuke Kishi, Hayato Ikeda, and Eisaku Satō. However, he was especially critical of the Kishi administration, and was strongly opposed to Kishi's handling of the massive 1960 Anpo protests against the U.S.-Japan Security Treaty. When Kishi railroaded the treaty through the Diet on May 19, 1960, Miki's faction absented itself from the vote in protest of Kishi's heavy-handed approach. On May 28, Miki and fellow faction leader Kenzō Matsumura issued a public call for Kishi's resignation, and Kishi was ultimately forced to resign in July.  However when Ichirō Kōno floated a plan later that summer to split up the LDP, Miki and Matsumura ultimately declined to support him. As punishment for taking part in the anti-Kishi rebellion, Miki was initially excluded from the cabinet of Kishi's successor Hayato Ikeda. However by the following year, Ikeda had cemented his power enough to overcome the objections of the Kishi faction and bring Miki back into the cabinet as Head of the Science and Technology Agency.

Although Ikeda was re-elected as party president in 1964, he retired soon afterwards due to illness. In the debate over who would succeed Ikeda as prime minister, Miki supported Kishi's brother Eisaku Satō while Matsumura supported Ichirō Kōno. This led to a falling out between Miki and his erstwhile ally Matsumura, and thereafter the two men went their separate ways. Miki's support for Satō also healed the rift that had been created when he had opposed Kishi during the Anpo crisis, and Miki was rewarded for his support with powerful posts in the Satō cabinet, first as Minister of International Trade and Industry (1965–66) and then as Minister of Foreign Affairs (1966-68).

As the foreign minister under Satō, Miki secretly met in 1967 with American ambassador to Japan U. Alexis Johnson to discuss "how to reconcile Japanese desire for reversion [of Okinawa] with [American] military requirements." This was part of a series of resolute attempts by several Japanese officials within the same time period aimed at convincing the United States to reconsider its continued hold on Okinawa, which the U.S. had formerly insisted should remain under American protection so long as there was any remaining instability in East Asia. In matters of regional foreign policy, Miki was an early advocate of Asia-Pacific economic cooperation and, in 1968, he said that "'it would be an act of suicide on our part to create an exclusive and closed trading bloc in the Pacific area." Despite this, ASEAN would later decline to invite now-Prime Minister Miki to the organisation's very first summit at Bali in 1976, as economic perceptions towards Japan in the region were negative because of resentment towards both wartime abuse by Imperial Japan as well as Japan's current status as a powerful economic giant with a heavy trade surplus.

Miki took over from Kakuei Tanaka as Prime Minister on 9 December 1974, following the latter's implication in the corruption concerning real-estate and construction companies. The attractiveness of Miki to the LDP bosses was chiefly due to his personal integrity, and his weak power base from his small faction. In fact, Miki had neither expected nor wanted to be prime minister at all, as was reflected when upon his election he murmured "a bolt from the blue".

While Miki was at the funeral of ex-PM Eisaku Sato in 1975, he was assaulted by a right-wing extremist named Hiroyoshi Fudeyasu, the secretary-general of the Greater Japan Patriotic Party with foreign dignitaries nearby. This caused criticism of the Tokyo Metropolitan Police over not doing enough to ensure his safety.

In a 1976 Diet session, Miki reaffirmed a past order of Prime Minister Satō's cabinet dating back to 1967 in which the percent of the national GDP allocated towards defense spending was frozen so as to not exceed 1%. This policy taboo was broken by future Prime Minister Yasuhiro Nakasone in the 1980s, but was revived in 1990 by another future Prime Minister, Toshiki Kaifu, who was a member of the faction that descended from Miki's faction. This policy has again come under renewed attention within modern Japan in light of contemporary discussions about constitutional revision and, by extension, the possible expansion of Japan's defense capabilities. In any event, Miki also pushed the Diet to fully ratify the Treaty on the Non-Proliferation of Nuclear Weapons, and he also worked to further strengthen previous policies set in motion by Prime Minister Satō which virtually committed Japan to not engage in the export of arms to any country.

After being elected, Miki attempted to reform the LDP, relentlessly investigating the Lockheed bribery scandals and refusing to halt the criminal prosecutions being made against his predecessor. Miki also pursued political finance reforms. These activities made him a large number of enemies within the party, and a campaign literally called "Down with Miki" ("Miki oroshi") was started by influential faction leaders. Despite Miki's personal popularity with the public, the Lockheed scandal reflected poorly on the party, which lost its overall majority in the 1976 election to the Diet and had to make deals with minor parties to remain in power. As is customary for Japanese political officials following heavy party setbacks, Miki then resigned. He was succeeded on 24 December 1976, by Takeo Fukuda.

Legacy 
In Mao Zedong's final days, he took a great interest in Miki's political condition, as Miki was suffering a coup d'état from amongst his own party. Mao had never shown any interest in Miki before, or even mentioned him.

NFL player Takeo Spikes was named after Miki.

Connection to Seattle 
During his time in Seattle, Miki spent a period as a dishwasher at noted Japanese restaurant Maneki.

To commemorate the ties of Japan to America, and Seattle in particular, Miki gave 1,000 cherry trees to Seattle to commemorate the United States Bicentennial in 1976. This gift gave birth to the Seattle Cherry Blossom Festival, still running annually.

Slang Term 
In Hong Kong, the name "Takeo Miki" (三木武夫) is sometimes used to describe actors or actresses with wooden or no emotional expressions during movies or TV dramas. Some have said that the origin for the slang term stems from Miki's wooden expression during his appearance in news reports.

Honours 
Grand Cordon of the Order of the Chrysanthemum (14 November 1988; posthumous)

Foreign honour 
 : Sash of the Order of the Aztec Eagle (18 September 1967)

Gallery

References

Citations

Works cited

|-

|-

|-

|-

|-

|-

|-

|-

|-

|-

|-

|-

|-

|-

1907 births
1988 deaths
20th-century prime ministers of Japan
Prime Ministers of Japan
People from Tokushima Prefecture
Meiji University alumni
University of Southern California alumni
Liberal Democratic Party (Japan) politicians
20th-century Japanese politicians
Deputy Prime Ministers of Japan
Foreign ministers of Japan
Politicians from Tokushima Prefecture